Nicola Kim Fairbrother MBE (born 14 May 1970) is a retired judoka from the United Kingdom, who competed at two Olympic Games. She currently holds the 7th Dan and is one of Britain's most prominent judoka.

Judo career
Fairbrother's first significant success was becoming champion of Great Britain, winning the lightweight division at the British Judo Championships in 1989. The following year she gained her first senior international success when she won a bronze medal at the 1990 European Judo Championships in Frankfurt.

In 1991, she won a bronze medal at the 1991 World Judo Championships in Barcelona and won back to back British titles in 1991 and 1992. During 1992, she was selected to represent Great Britain at the 1992 Summer Olympics. She won the silver medal in the women's lightweight division (– 56 kg). In the final she was defeated by Spain's Miriam Blasco, who later she married. Additionally, she won her first European title at the 1992 European Judo Championships in Paris.

The following year in 1993, she successfully defended her European crown and won her second World title, winning gold at the 1993 World Judo Championships in Hamilton. European silver in 1994 and European gold in 1995 added to the medal collection before she went to her second Olympic Games, the 1996 Summer Olympics, in Atlanta. In the women's 56 kg she was unlucky in that she drew the eventual gold medallist Driulis González in the quarter finals.

In 1998 and 1999, she won her fourth and fifth British Championship titles.  She retired from competitive judo at the end of 1999.

Awards
In 1994, she was awarded the MBE for services to judo by HRM The Queen.

Personal life
Fairbrother is married to Miriam Blasco. She has authored a number of children's judo books and from 2001 to 2018 she was the editor of the Koka Kids Judo magazine.

References

External links
 
 Nicola Fairbrother personal blog on Spanish foods
 Koka Kids Judo Magazine website
 British Olympic Committee

English female judoka
Judoka at the 1992 Summer Olympics
Judoka at the 1996 Summer Olympics
Olympic silver medallists for Great Britain
1970 births
Living people
People from Henley-on-Thames
Place of birth missing (living people)
Olympic medalists in judo
English LGBT sportspeople
Medalists at the 1992 Summer Olympics
Goodwill Games medalists in judo
Lesbian sportswomen
LGBT judoka
Competitors at the 1990 Goodwill Games